Carabus vogtianus, is a species of ground beetle in the large genus Carabus.

References 

vogtianus
Insects described in 1943